A hunting dog is a canine that hunts with or for hunters. There are several different types of hunting dog developed for various tasks and purposes. The major categories of hunting dog include hounds, terriers, dachshunds, cur type dogs, and gun dogs. Further distinctions within these categories can be made, based upon the dog's skills and capabilities. They are usually larger and have a more sensitive smell than normal dogs.

Breeds and capabilities used in hunting 
For a list of breeds of each type, see the detailed articles for each category:

Gallery

See also 
 , hunting dogs constellation
 
 
 Dogs portal
 Key Underwood Coon Dog Memorial Graveyard

References

Further reading 
 Deeley, Martin. "Working Gundogs: An Introduction to Training and Handling. (1990, reprinted 2002) The Crowood Press. .
 Fergus, Charles. Gun Dog Breeds, A Guide to Spaniels, Retrievers, and Pointing Dogs, The Lyons Press, 2002. 
 Roettger, Anthony Z. and Schleider, Benjamin H. III. (2004) Urban Gun Dogs: Training flushing dogs for home and field. The Writer's Collective.

External links 
 How to Introduce Your Dog to Gunfire Sound

Dog roles
 
Working dogs